{{Infobox person
| name=Arianna Afsar
| birth_place= San Diego, California, U.S.
| birth_name= Arianna Ayesha Afsar
| birth_date= 
| education = University of California, Los Angeles (BA)
| notable_works      = Hamilton (2016)Jeannette: The Musical (2019)Allegory (2019)| occupation = 
| website            = 
}}
Arianna Ayesha "Ari" Afsar (born October 22, 1991) is an American singer, composer, beauty queen and activist best known for her starring role in Hamilton, as the songwriter of the musical Jeannette, and as a top contestant on American Idol.

 Early life and education 
Afsar is from San Diego. Her father is from Bangladesh and her mother is of German origin. She attended Westview High School where she opened Adopt-a-Grandfriend in 2005, to fight loneliness of senior citizens. After graduating Westview in 2009, she attended the University of California, Los Angeles.

 Career 

 Pageant 
Afsar won the Miss America's Outstanding Teen title for California in 2005 and represented California in the inaugural Miss America's Outstanding Teen pageant in Orlando, Florida in August 2005. As the youngest contestant in the competition, she won a preliminary talent award and placed first runner-up.

She was the winner of Miss San Diego County in 2010.

In 2010 Afsar competed in the Miss California pageant for the first time and won the Miss California 2010 title. She competed in the Miss America 2011 pageant in January 2011 and placed in top 10.

American Idol
In 2009, Afsar was a contestant on American Idol 8.  She auditioned in Phoenix and sang "Put Your Records On" by Corinne Bailey Rae. She was one of the final 36 contestants. Afsar progressed to the live semi-finals but failed to make it through her group and was not selected to compete for a wildcard by the judges.

Theatre
In 2001 she appeared in a production of Dr. Seuss' How the Grinch Stole Christmas! The Musical as Cindy Lou Who.

It was announced on July 13, 2016, that Afsar would portray the role of Elizabeth Schuyler Hamilton in the Chicago production of Hamilton beginning performances in late September 2016. Afsar left the Chicago production on March 25, 2018, but briefly returned to the role for the 2nd National Tour's stop at Segerstrom Center for the Arts for the weekend of May 19, 2018.

Afsar wrote the music and lyrics to the musical We Won't Sleep (formerly Jeannette) with a book by playwright Lauren Gunderson. The musical is about U.S. Rep. Jeannette Rankin, the first woman elected to Congress.  Under the title Jeannette, it was part of the 2019 summer series at the National Music Theater Conference at the Eugene O'Neill Theater Center in Connecticut. We Won't Sleep is scheduled to have its world premiere at the Tony Award-winning Signature Theatre in Arlington, Virginia in 2022.

 Politics and activism 
Afsar is also a women's rights activist. She is on the board of the ACLU of Illinois Next Gen. She spoke at the youth reception for the American Civil Liberties Union national convention. She is an avid supporter and vocal advocate for Planned Parenthood, United State of Women, and the Women's March. Afsar opened for Michelle Obama at the United State of Women at the Shrine Auditorium. 

 Other 
Afsar played the role of "Ellie" in the direct-to-video science fiction action film Martian Land''.

Filmography

Film

Television

References

1991 births
Living people
Musicians from San Diego
American Idol participants
Beauty pageant contestants from California
American beauty pageant winners
Miss America's Outstanding Teen delegates
Miss America 2011 delegates
Singers from California
21st-century American women singers
21st-century American singers
University of California, Los Angeles alumni
American people of Bangladeshi descent